The 1983 Bulgarian Cup Final was the 43rd final of the Bulgarian Cup, and was contested between CSKA Sofia and Spartak Varna on 3 April 1983 at Plovdiv Stadium in Plovdiv. CSKA won the final 4–0.

Match

Details

See also
1982–83 A Group
1983 Cup of the Soviet Army Final

References

Bulgarian Cup finals
PFC CSKA Sofia matches
Cup Final